Parking is the act of stopping a vehicle and leaving it unoccupied for more than a brief time.

Parking may also refer to:

Films
 Parking (1985 film), a French film directed by Jacques Demy
 Parking (2008 film), a Taiwanese film
 Parking (2019 film), an internationally co-produced film

Computing and technology
 Call parking, moving an ongoing telephone conversation from one phone to another
 CPU core parking, of a microprocessor in PCs
 Domain parking, advertising content posted on an undeveloped domain on the World Wide Web, often used during construction of a page

Other uses
 Parking, a term often used to refer to a:
 Parking facility 
 Parking fee
 Parking, a euphemism for making out while in a car
 Parking, a term for road verge in parts of the United States

See also
"No Parking on the Dance Floor"
Parkin (disambiguation)